Pablo Henn (born 15 July 1982) is an Argentine rugby union footballer who plays at prop for London Welsh and has also represented the Argentina national rugby union team.

Career
Henn started his career with Hindu Club in Argentina. In 2005, he was signed by the top French club Stade Francais who compete in the Top 14. After one season, in 2006, he joined US Montauban who play in the Top 14, the first level of domestic competition in France. He was signed by CA Brive. After 5 seasons, he left Brive and he signed for Limgoes for the 2013-14 season, competing in Federale 1, the third level of domestic competition in France. On 10 July 2014, Henn was signed to the English club London Welsh who compete in the Aviva Premiership from the 2014-15 season.

References

External links
at scrum.com
at rugbytime.com
at rugbyrama.com
London Welsh profile

1982 births
Living people
Argentine rugby union players
Argentina international rugby union players
Stade Français players
CA Brive players
Rugby union props
Sportspeople from Buenos Aires Province